Nepal–Sri Lanka relations refers to foreign relations between Nepal and Sri Lanka.

Nepal–Sri Lanka relations were officially established on 1 July 1957.

References 

 
Sri Lanka
Nepal